Vienna, City of My Dreams (German: Wien, du Stadt meiner Träume) is a 1957 Austrian musical comedy film directed by Willi Forst and starring Adrian Hoven, Erika Remberg and Hertha Feiler.

The film's sets were designed by the art directors Isabella Schlichting and Werner Schlichting.

Cast
 Adrian Hoven as Peter Lehnert, Musikprofessor  
 Erika Remberg as Sandra, Prinzessin von Alanien  
 Hertha Feiler as Elisabeth Seyboldt  
 Hans Holt as Alexander I., König von Alanien 
 Paul Hörbiger as Vater Lehnert  
 Alma Seidler as Mutter Lehnert  
 Oskar Sima as von Trotum - Gesandter  
 Jane Tilden as Klara von Trotum  
 Richard Romanowsky as Katzelseder - Sektionschef  
 Lilly Stepanek as Frau von Waldegg 
 Erwin Strahl as Mirko, ein alanischer Emissär  
 Hannes Schiel as Oberstleutnant Morosos 
 Peter Brand as Chauffeur der Gesandtschaft  
 Alfred Böhm as Polizist  
 Otto Fassler as Konzertmeister  
 Peter Fröhlich as Reporter  
 Peter Gerhard as Empfangschef  
 Hugo Gottschlich as Bauarbeiter  
 Fred Hennings as Polizeipräsident  
 Fritz Imhoff
 Herbert Kersten as Sekretär der Gesandtschaft  
 Fritz Muliar as Spöttischer Passant  
 Auguste Ripper as Blumenfrau  
 Walter Simmerl as Bezechter  
 Otto Treßler as Fürst Vitus

References

Bibliography 
 Reimer, Robert C. & Reimer, Carol J. The A to Z of German Cinema. Scarecrow Press, 2010.

External links 
 

1957 films
1957 musical comedy films
Austrian musical comedy films
1950s German-language films
Films directed by Willi Forst
Films set in Vienna